Damla Günay (born 24 November 1982) is an athlete from Turkey. She competes in archery.

Günay represented Turkey at the 2004 Summer Olympics.  She placed 42nd in the women's individual ranking round with a 72-arrow score of 620.  In the first round of elimination, she faced 23rd-ranked Anja Hitzler of Germany.  Günay lost 163-152 in the 18-arrow match, placing 38th overall in women's individual archery. She was also a member of the 10th-place Turkish women's archery team.

Günay participated at the 2005 Mediterranean Games in Almería, Spain ranking 14th in the women's individual category. With the Turkish team, she won silver medal.

International achievements
  2004, Italy - Indoors European Championship: 8th.
  2004, Italy - Grand Prix: 26th.
 2004, Belgium -  European Championship: 5th (the qualifier for 2004 Summer Olympics)
 2004, Germany - Grand Prix: 53rd.

References

1982 births
Living people
Turkish female archers
Olympic archers of Turkey
Archers at the 2004 Summer Olympics
Mediterranean Games silver medalists for Turkey
Competitors at the 2005 Mediterranean Games
Mediterranean Games medalists in archery
21st-century Turkish sportswomen